Arthur Luppino (born c. 1934), also known as "The Cactus Comet", was an American football player.  He grew up in La Jolla, California, and played college football for the Arizona Wildcats football team. He twice led the NCAA major colleges in rushing yardage with 1,359 rushing yards in 1954 and 1,313 rushing yards in 1955. In 1954, he also broke the NCAA modern-era single-season scoring record with 166 points.

Luppino became a school teacher in San Diego, retiring in the mid-90s. He also owned a martial arts studio and a gun shop.

See also
 List of NCAA major college football yearly rushing leaders
 List of NCAA major college football yearly scoring leaders
 List of NCAA major college yearly punt and kickoff return leaders

References

American football halfbacks
Arizona Wildcats football players
Players of American football from West Virginia
1930s births
Living people